This is an alphabetical list of streets, alley, squares, and other structures in Gamla stan, the old town of Stockholm, including the islands Stadsholmen, Helgeandsholmen, Strömsborg, and Riddarholmen.

Gamla stan, List of streets and squares in
Gamla stan, List of streets and squares in
Sweden geography-related lists
Street and squares
Gamla stan